Padthaway wine region is a wine zone region located in the south east of South Australia immediately adjoining a section of the Riddoch Highway including the town of Padthaway.  The region received appellation as an Australian Geographical Indication (AGI) in 1999.

Extent and appellation
The term ‘Padthaway’ was registered as an AGI on 29 November 1999.

Grapes and wine
Alternatively, red wine varietals account for of plantings while white wines varietals account for of plantings.  
As of 2014, the region is reported as having eight wineries and as of 2008, it had 31 growers.

See also

South Australian wine

Citations and references

Citations

References

External links
Padthaway Grape Growers Association
Padthaway Wine Region official tourism webpage

Wine regions of South Australia
Limestone Coast